The Main Squeeze is an American funk band from Bloomington, Indiana.

History
The Main Squeeze formed as a party band at Indiana University in 2010. In 2012, they released their first self-titled LP.  Three years later, they released their second full-length album titled Mind Your Head. The album was produced by producer Randy Jackson.  In 2017, The Main Squeeze released their third full-length album titled Without a Sound. In 2020, the band released their fourth full-length album titled 12345. In 2022, the band released their fifth full-length album titled To Be Determined.

Band members
Corey Frye (vocals, keys) 
Ben “Smiley” Silverstein (keys, keytar)
Maximillian Newman (guitar)
Reuben Gingrich (drums)
Rob "Skywalker" Walker (bass, keys, vocals)

Former members
Will Rob (bass, vocals)
Bradley Friedman (drums)
Jeremiah Hunt (bass, vocals)

Discography

Albums

Studio albums

Live albums

Extended Plays

Singles

References

External links
 
 
 

American funk musical groups
Musical groups established in 2010
Musical groups from Indiana
2010 establishments in Indiana